Deborah Turner Harris (born 1951 in Pennsylvania), is an American fantasy author, best known for her collaborations with Katherine Kurtz.

Life
Harris lives in Scotland and is married to Scottish author Robert J. Harris.

Works

Mages of Garillon
The Burning Stone (1986)
The Gauntlet of Malice (1987)
Spiral of Fire (1989)

Caledon
Caledon of the Mists (1994)
The Queen of Ashes (1995)
The City of Exile (1997)

The Adept 
(with Katherine Kurtz)
Book I: The Adept (1991)
Book II: The Lodge of the Lynx (1992)
Book III: The Templar Treasure (1993)
Book IV: Dagger Magic (1995)
Book V: Death of an Adept (1996)

Knights Templar books 
(with Katherine Kurtz)
Book I: The Temple And the Stone (1998)
Book II: The Temple and the Crown (April 2001)

External links
The Website of Deborah Turner Harris and Robert J Harris

1951 births
Living people
20th-century American novelists
21st-century American novelists
American fantasy writers
American women novelists
Women science fiction and fantasy writers
20th-century American women writers
21st-century American women writers